2013 Iran earthquake may refer to several deadly earthquakes that struck Iran in 2013:

2013 Bushehr earthquake, a magnitude 6.3  earthquake that struck the Iranian province of Bushehr, near the city of Khvormuj and the towns of Kaki and Shonbeh on April 9, 2013. At least 37 people were killed and 850 others were injured.
2013 Saravan earthquake, a magnitude 7.7  earthquake that struck a mountainous area between the cities of Saravan and Khash in Sistan and Baluchestan Province, Iran, close to the border with Pakistan, on 16 April 2013. It was the largest earthquake in Iran within the last 40 years, killing 1 person in Iran and 34 others in Pakistan.
2013 Borazjan earthquake, a magnitude 5.6  earthquake that struck near the city of Borazjan in southern Iran on 28 November 2013, killing several people.

See also
List of earthquakes in 2013
List of earthquakes in Iran